The Chrysler Engineering Corp. T36D turboprop engine, design-rated at 2,500 lb thrust, was ordered by the United States Navy in 1948, but was deemed unnecessary as the aircraft it was to power was canceled. The engine development was stopped, and the program was canceled before any engines were built.

Specifications (T36D)

References

 Fahey, James Charles. The ships and aircraft of the United States Fleet 6th edition  p54  

1940s turboprop engines
Abandoned military aircraft engine projects of the United States